is the second mini-album by Fujifabric, released in 2003 under the independent Japanese record label Song-Crux.

Track listing
 
 
 
 
 
 

Fujifabric albums
2003 EPs